Fodie Traoré (born 1 March 1985 in Bondy, France) is a French former professional footballer who played as a midfielder on the professional level for French Ligue 1 club Stade Brestois 29 in the 2010–11 season.

See also
Football in France
List of football clubs in France
List of French football transfers summer 2010

References

1985 births
Living people
French people of Malian descent
Sportspeople from Bondy
French footballers
Association football midfielders
Footballers from Seine-Saint-Denis